Anthony Michael Ray Bower (born February 12, 1975) is an American actor best known for his role as Eddie "Donkeylips" Gelfen on the television program Salute Your Shorts,<ref name=biogrint>{{cite news|last=Stephanie Webber|title=Interview: 'Salute Your Shorts Michael Bower Talks Past Roles And What He's Been Up To|url=http://ology.com/tv/interview-michael-bower-talks-past-roles-and-what-hes-been|access-date=5 December 2011|newspaper=Ology|date=October 19, 2011}}</ref> which aired from 1991 to 1992 on Nickelodeon and for which he won a  Young Artist Award.

Career
Born in Tarzana, California, Bower made his film debut at age 11, in Michael Jackson's 1988 Moonwalker.  He had appearances in episodic television series such as Webster, Tales from the Crypt, Empty Nest, Superior Court, Hull High,  The Wonder Years, and Doogie Howser, M.D., before being brought into Salute Your Shorts for 20 episodes as the major character of Eddie 'Donkeylips' Gelfen.  After that series, he continued with guest roles on well-known television series, including that of Monica Geller's (Courteney Cox) prom date on an episode of Friends.  He has also appeared in movies such as Marilyn Hotchkiss' Ballroom Dancing and Charm School and Ivan Reitman's Evolution. Bower had a small role in an episode of the FOX series Dark Angel, and played in the indie film Social Misfits, and the comedy short film Dinner with Raphael (written and directed by Joey Boukadakis).

Bower appeared as a contestant on the game show Fun House in the late 1980s as well as Nick Arcade in the early 1990s. He also appears in the music video for "Download This Song" by MC Lars. He has also appeared as a contestant on Singled Out and had a guest role on The Wonder Years as Peter Armbruster in 3 episodes in the early 1990s. He provides the voice of "Eugene Reaper" in Grand Theft Auto IV.

Bower can also be seen on commercials for Mountain Dew's Amp Energy Drinks as a high-voltage, dancing mechanic.

Awards
1992 - Young Artist Award winner - 	Best Young Actor in a Cable Series - Salute Your ShortsSelected filmography

Television
 Webster (1 episode, 1988) as Mayor
 Mike Hammer: Murder Takes All (1989) as Velda's Nephew
 Tales from the Crypt (1 episode, 1989) as Junior
 Empty Nest (2 episodes, 1989–1990) as Josh
 Superior Court (1 episode, 1990) as Joey
 Hull High (1 episode, 1990) as Big Boy
 The Wonder Years, (3 episodes, 1990–1991) as Peter Armbruster, Kid, Joe
 Doogie Howser, M.D., (2 episodes, 1990–1991) as Boy Nerd, Josh
 Salute Your Shorts, (26 episodes, 1991–1992) as Eddie 'Donkeylips' Gelfen
 Running the Halls (1 episode, 1993) as Super George
 The Day My Parents Ran Away (1993) as Richie
 Weird Science (1 episode, 1994) as Kyle
 California Dreams, TV (2 episodes, 1992–1994) as Tommy
 Tattooed Teenage Alien Fighters from Beverly Hills (1 episode, 1995) as Alex
 Friends (1 episode, 1996) as Roy Gublik
 Rescue 77 (1 episode, 1999) as Party Guy
 Chicken Soup for the Soul (1 episode, 2000) as Henry
 The X-Files (First Person Shooter, 2000)
 Dark Angel (Brainiac, 2002)
 Monk (1 episode, 2006) as Peter
 CSI: Crime Scene Investigation (Living Doll, 2007)
 Bones (The Finder, 2011) as Sam Nozik
 Raising Hope (1 episode, 2014) as Kevin

Film
 Moonwalker (1988) (scenes deleted)
 She's Out of Control (1989) as Kid at Beach
 Marilyn Hotchkiss' Ballroom Dancing and Charm School (1990) as Glen Tanksley
 The Willies (1990) as Gordy Belcher
 Captain Nuke and the Bomber Boys (1995) as Frank Pescoe
 High School High (1996) as Heckler (Uncredited)
 Dude, Where's My Car? (2000) as Big Cult Guard
 Social Misfits (2001) as Edgar
 Evolution (2001) as Danny Donald
 Wishcraft (2002) as Tony
 Sex and the Teenage Mind (2002) as Dwayne
 Marilyn Hotchkiss' Ballroom Dancing and Charm School (2005) as Tommy Tanksley
 Dinner with Raphael (2009) as Raphael, Jimmy
 Perfect Combination (2010) as Tony
 Dumbbells (2014) as Erwin
 Cocked (2015) as Technician
 The Bread of Wickedness (2018)

Video games
 Grand Theft Auto: Vice City Stories (2006) as Commercial Voice, People of Vice City
 Bully (2006) as Mr. Buckingham
 Grand Theft Auto IV (2008) as Eugene Reaper, The Crowd of Liberty City, Commercial
 Grand Theft Auto: The Ballad of Gay Tony (2009) as Eugene Reaper (Archive Footage)
 Halo 3: ODST (2009) as Additional Voices
 Red Dead Redemption (2010) as The Local Population
 Star Wars: The Old Republic'' (2011) as Additional Voices (Uncredited)

References

External links
 
 

1975 births
American male child actors
American male film actors
American male television actors
Contestants on American game shows
Living people
Male actors from California
People from Tarzana, Los Angeles